The Death of Hope by Jude Watson is the fifteenth in a series of young reader novels called Jedi Apprentice. The series explores the adventures of Qui-Gon Jinn and Obi-Wan Kenobi prior to Star Wars: Episode I – The Phantom Menace.

Plot
Everything is a confusion in the New Apsolon mission. The Jedi Knight Tahl, partner of Qui-Gon Jinn, has been trapped. The Jedi Master soon forgets his apprentice Obi-Wan Kenobi and goes after his beloved Tahl. No one can be trusted and Tahl is dying.

When Obi-Wan and Qui-Gon discover Tahl, she is severely maimed. After returning to the capital, Tahl perishes, which sends Qui-Gon over the edge. Qui-Gon now begins his call to vengeance, which is targeted at the leader of the rogue faction that caused the entire catastrophe.

External links

Official CargoBay Listing
TheForce.net review

2001 British novels
2001 science fiction novels
Star Wars: Jedi Apprentice
Star Wars Legends novels
English novels
Scholastic Corporation books